2019 World Ice Hockey Championships may refer to:

 2019 Men's World Ice Hockey Championships
 2019 IIHF World Championship
 2019 World Junior Ice Hockey Championships
 2019 IIHF World U18 Championships